The , commonly referred to as , are a series of live theatre productions based on the Sailor Moon manga by Naoko Takeuchi. The series consists of 31 musicals which have had more than 800 performances since the show opened in the summer of 1993. The first set of musicals, which ran from 1993 to 2005, were produced by Bandai with over 500 performances. The current musicals have been produced by Nelke Planning (a subsidiary of Dwango) since 2013.

History 
Each musical typically runs for three engagements per year, timed to align with school holidays in the winter, spring, and summer. Musicals were historically staged at the Sunshine Theatre in Ikebukuro, Tokyo in the winter and spring, and tour Japan in the summer.

After  was staged in January 2005, the actresses for Moon, Mercury, and Jupiter "graduated" (left the show), and the series went on hiatus.

In June 2013, Takeuchi's editor Fumio Osano announced that a new Sailor Moon musical, La Reconquista, would open in September 2013, with Takeuchi personally auditioning actresses for the cast. The cast featured Satomi Ōkubo as Sailor Moon, Miyabi Matsuura as Sailor Mercury, Kanon Nanaki as Sailor Mars, Yū Takahashi as Sailor Jupiter, Shiori Sakata as Sailor Venus, and Yūga Yamato as Tuxedo Mask, making La Reconquista the first Sailor Moon musical where all roles were played by women. The musical recounts the battles between the Sailor Soldiers and the Dark Kingdom over the search for the Silver Crystal. The musical was produced, directed and written by Takuya Hiramitsu, who directed SeraMyu from 1995 to 1998, with music by Toshihiko Sahashi. The musical ran from September 13 to 23 at the AiiA Theater Tokyo in Shibuya, Tokyo.

Petite Étrangère, a musical based on Sailor Moon R, ran at AiiA Theater Tokyo from August 21 to August 31, 2014, and at Osaka from September 5 to September 7. A version of Petite Étrangère was staged in Shanghai, China, in January 2015 at the Shanghai Theatre Academy Theatre for a run of five performances, making Petite Étrangère the first official Japanese production of a Sailor Moon musical to open outside Japan.

The series made its North America debut in 2019 with Pretty Soldier Sailor Moon - The Super Live, which was staged as a limited engagement on March 29 and 30 at the PlayStation Theater in New York City. The musical also played at the Warner Theatre in Washington, D.C. on March 24.

Recurring elements

The musicals typically feature a theme song, usually performed after the Sailor Soldiers defeat the antagonist; sight gags (such as cross-dressing and puns); and songs tailored for characters or groupings of characters, such as romantic songs between Usagi Tsukino and Mamoru Chiba, attack songs for the Sailor Soldiers, songs the Sailor Soldiers perform as civilians, and villain songs.

"Revised Versions" (known as Kaiteiban) are another major aspect of Sailor Moon musicals. Generally, new musicals are staged in the summer are revised for the winter. The overarching plot remains the same, but certain plot elements are rearranged: villains who were only partially defeated in the original version of the show are fully defeated or healed, and actresses who are "graduating" are given more solo parts or speaking lines.

Often, the musicals expand upon plot concepts presented in the anime and manga. Most notably, a romance between the four Sailor Soldiers and the Four Kings of Heaven in their former lives was adapted from a manga image picturing the two groups paired off as romantic couples. In addition to adapting material from anime and manga versions of Sailor Moon, the musical series also has two original plot lines:  and the Last Dracul series.

Most shows end with an extended curtain call and encore, during which a number of songs are performed. Popular songs from the anime series such as "Moonlight Densetsu" and "La Soldier", which would not make narrative sense in the plot of the musical, are frequently performed as fan service. Special fan appreciation shows referred to as FanKan (deriving from "fan thank you") are used as season finales, where multiple fan service numbers are performed and new actresses are introduced.

The musicals have introduced new characters to the series, often as new members of existing groups of villains, such as Spotted Tilmun, Aaron and Manna from the Black Moon Clan, the Death Mannetjes and the Death Nightmares from the Death Busters, and Sailors Pewter Fox, Titanium Kerokko, Theta, and Buttress from Shadow Galactica. The musicals have also created original characters that have never appeared in any other version of the series, such as Sailor Astarte, Vulcan, Count Dracul, Bloody Dracul Vampir, Undead Berserk, and Death Lamia, among others.

Production
The sets and backdrops range from simple (only some set pieces, no backdrop or backdrop with uncomplicated paintings) to mid elaborate (a greater number of small set pieces, and some bigger ones, for example, a painted wall over the whole width of the stage with a few attached stairs and a big door), more detailed set pieces, with heavy use of different stage levels, trapdoors and hidden doors. The Sailor Soldiers' attacks are represented by colored lights hitting their targets, and sometimes minor explosions and other small pyrotechnics (for example "flame paper", special paper stripes which the actors ignite in their hands and then throw to create the illusion of a "fireball") are used. The Sailor Soldiers mostly transform off-stage (or just appear already transformed), while their transformation phrases can be heard. Only Usagi transforms on stage. This is done with the help of a body double and the "black out" of part of the stage or set pieces moving in front of her while the actors switch places. The only real "transformation sequence" that ever occurs is a pre-filmed video sequence projected onto a scrim showing the actors "morph" (with some pink ribbons) into their transformed versions.

List of musicals 
"Stage" is a term used widely to refer to groupings of the musicals.

The producers of the show have broken the musical series down into three stages. The first stage consisted of those in which Sailor Moon was portrayed by Anza Ohyama, the first and longest running Sailor Moon actress. This stage ran parallel to the manga and anime, as reflected by the plot, and had a nearly full graduation with all of the main actresses being replaced. The second stage included three different Sailor Moon actresses, the only fully original musical (The Legend of Kaguya Island) and the semi-original Last Dracul series, ending with a remake of the original "Final First Stage" musical, Eien Densetsu (titled Kakyuu Ouhi Kourin.) The third stage retained Marina Kuroki as lead actress, but ran for only two musicals (both remakes of The Legend of Kaguya Island), and ended in January 2005.

The series ended its hiatus with a 20th Anniversary Stage in 2013, with Satomi Ōkubo cast as the new Sailor Moon.

Conversely, most Western fans break the stages down by the actresses who played Sailor Moon: 
Anza Ohyama, Fumina Hara, Miyuki Kanbe, and Marina Kuroki. The list below is divided up according to the official stages used by Sera Myu producers.

First Stage 
Featuring Anza Ohyama as Sailor Moon:
1993 Summer Special Musical Pretty Soldier Sailor Moon

1994 Winter Special Musical Pretty Soldier Sailor Moon

Pretty Soldier Sailor Moon Super Spring Festival

1994 Summer Special Musical Pretty Soldier Sailor Moon S

1995 Winter Special Musical Pretty Soldier Sailor Moon S

1995 Spring Special Musical Pretty Soldier Sailor Moon S

1995 Summer Special Musical Pretty Soldier Sailor Moon SuperS

1996 Spring Special Musical Pretty Soldier Sailor Moon SuperS (Kaiteiban)

Pretty Soldier Sailor Moon SuperS Special Musical Show
1996 Summer Special Musical Pretty Soldier Sailor Moon Sailor Stars
1997 Winter Special Musical Pretty Soldier Sailor Moon Sailor Stars (Kaiteiban)
1997 Summer Special Musical Pretty Soldier Sailor Moon

1998 Winter Special Musical Pretty Soldier Sailor Moon
 The Final First Stage!!

Second stage
Featuring Fumina Hara as Sailor Moon:
 1998 Summer Special Musical Pretty Soldier Sailor Moon

 1999 Spring Special Musical Pretty Soldier Sailor Moon

 1999 Summer Special Musical Pretty Soldier Sailor Moon

Third stage
Featuring Miyuki Kanbe as Sailor Moon:
 2000 Winter Special Musical Pretty Soldier Sailor Moon

 2000 Summer Special Musical Pretty Soldier Sailor Moon

 2001 Winter Special Musical Pretty Soldier Sailor Moon

 2001 Spring Special Musical Pretty Soldier Sailor Moon

Fourth stage
Featuring Marina Kuroki as Sailor Moon:
 2001 Summer Special Musical Pretty Soldier Sailor Moon

 2002 Winter Special Musical Pretty Soldier Sailor Moon

 2002 Spring Special Musical Pretty Soldier Sailor Moon "10th Anniversary Festival"

 2002 Summer Special Musical Pretty Soldier Sailor Moon

 2003 Winter Special Musical Pretty Soldier Sailor Moon

 2003 Summer Special Musical Pretty Soldier Sailor Moon

 2004 Winter Special Musical Pretty Soldier Sailor Moon
 THE SECOND STAGE FINAL
 2004 Summer Special Musical Pretty Soldier Sailor Moon
 NEW LEGEND OF KAGUYA ISLAND
 2005 Winter Special Musical Pretty Soldier Sailor Moon
 MARINAMOON FINAL

Fifth stage
Featuring Satomi Okubo as Sailor Moon:
 2013 Pretty Guardian Sailor Moon
La Reconquista
 2014 Pretty Guardian Sailor Moon
Petite Étrangère
 2015 Pretty Guardian Sailor Moon
Un Nouveau Voyage

Sixth stage
Featuring Hotaru Nomoto as Sailor Moon:
 2016 Pretty Guardian Sailor Moon
Amour Eternal
 2017 Pretty Guardian Sailor Moon
Le Mouvement Final

Seventh stage
Featuring Nogizaka46: Mizuki Yamashita, Sayuri Inoue, Shiori Kubo, Kanae Yumemiya, Natsuki Koga and Tomomi Kasai as Sailor Moon:
 2018 Pretty Guardian Sailor Moon
Nogizaka46 Ver. Musical Pretty Guardian Sailor Moon 2018 
2019 Pretty Guardian Sailor Moon
Nogizaka46 Ver. Musical Pretty Guardian Sailor Moon 2019

Eighth stage
Featuring Riko Tanaka as Sailor Moon:
 2021 Pretty Guardian Sailor Moon
Kaguya-hime no Koibito 

 2022 Pretty Guardian Sailor Moon
 "the 30th Anniversary Musical Festival -Chronicle-"

List of albums
Songs from the series have been compiled in some 20 music albums, and many of the musicals have been released on DVD.

 “Pretty Soldier Sailor Moon S” Musical Theme Songs: La Soldier / Sailor War!
 Memorial Album of the Musical “Pretty Soldier Sailor Moon”: An Alternate Legend: The Dark Kingdom Revival Story
 Memorial Album of the Musical 2 “Pretty Soldier Sailor Moon S”: Usagi — The Path to Become the Soldier of Love
 Memorial Album of the Musical 3 “Pretty Soldier Sailor Moon SuperS”: Dream Warriors — Love — Into Eternity...
 Memorial Album of the Musical 4 “Pretty Soldier Sailor Moon Sailor Stars”
 Memorial Album of the Musical 5 “Pretty Soldier Sailor Moon” Eternal Legend
 Memorial Album of the Musical “Pretty Soldier Sailor Moon”: ~ Best Sound Track ~
 Memorial Album of the Musical 6 “Pretty Soldier Sailor Moon” Beginning of the New Legend* Memorial Album of the Musical 7 “Pretty Soldier Sailor Moon” Legend of Kaguya Island* Memorial Album of the Musical “Pretty Soldier Sailor Moon”: Theme Songs 1993~1999* Memorial Album of the Musical 8 “Pretty Soldier Sailor Moon” New / Transformation — The Path to Become the Super Soldier — Overture of Last Dracul</ref>
 Memorial Album of the Musical “Pretty Soldier Sailor Moon”: Best Songs Collection — Best Songs Chosen by Fans —
 Memorial Album of the Musical 9 “Pretty Soldier Sailor Moon” Decisive Battle / Transylvania's Forest ~ New Appearance! The Warriors Who Protect Chibi-Moon ~
 Memorial Album of the Musical “Pretty Soldier Sailor Moon”: ~ Best Sound Track Vol. 2 ~
 Memorial Album of the Musical “Pretty Soldier Sailor Moon”: Eternal Edition — Senshi Theme Songs + Karaoke Collection
 Memorial Album of the Musical “Pretty Soldier Sailor Moon”: Love Ballad Edition
 Memorial Album of the Musical 10 “Pretty Soldier Sailor Moon” ~ Birth! The Princess of Darkness Black Lady ~
 Memorial Album of the Musical “Pretty Soldier Sailor Moon”: Dark Side Edition: Best Songs
 Memorial Album of the Musical “Pretty Soldier Sailor Moon”: Eternal Edition 2 — Birth! Princess of Darkness Black Lady [Revision] ~ The Secret of the Planet Nemesis ~
 Memorial Album of the Musical 11 “Pretty Soldier Sailor Moon” Infinity Academy ~ Mistress Labyrinth ~
 Memorial Album of the Musical “Pretty Soldier Sailor Moon”: Eternal Edition 3 — “10th Anniversary” Sailor Moon to Issho ni Pretty Child — Infinity Academy ~ Mistress Labyrinth ~ Revision
 Memorial Album of the Musical 12 “Pretty Soldier Sailor Moon” ~ Starlights — Legend of the Shooting Stars ~
 Memorial Album of the Musical “Pretty Soldier Sailor Moon”: ~ Best Sound Track Vol. 3 ~
 Memorial Album of the Musical 13 “Pretty Soldier Sailor Moon” ~ New Legend of Kaguya Island ~
 Memorial Album of the Musical “Pretty Soldier Sailor Moon”: Eternal Edition 4 — MARINAMOON Special Edition — New Legend of Kaguya Island (Revision) MARINAMOON FINAL

Reception

In total, 32,055 people attended , which had 29 separate performances. 25,208 people attended its revised edition, which had 35 separate performances.

References

External links 
 Official Site
 Sailor Moon 20th Anniversary Stage Official Site
 Labyrinthine plot complicates fun musical.

Musicals
Musicals based on anime and manga
Japanese musicals
2.5D musicals